The 1994 FIFA World Cup knockout stage was the second and final stage of the 1994 FIFA World Cup finals in the United States. The stage began on July 2, 1994, and ended with the final at the Rose Bowl in Pasadena, California on July 17, 1994.

Sixteen teams advanced to the knockout stage to compete in a single-elimination style tournament: The top two teams from each of the six groups, as well as the best four third-placed teams. In the round of 16, the four third-placed teams played against four of the group winners from group A-D, with the remaining two group winners from group E and F taking on two of the group runners-up; the remaining four runners-up were paired off against each other. The winners of the eight round of 16 matches were then paired together in the quarter-finals, the winners of which played against each other in the semi-finals.

The ties in each round were played over a single match; in the event that scores were level after 90 minutes, the teams would play an additional 30 minutes of extra time, divided into two 15-minute halves, to determine the winner. If the scores remained level after extra time, the teams would contest a penalty shootout.

A third place match was also held on the day before the final, between the two losing teams of the semi-finals.

Qualified teams

The top two placed teams from each of the six groups, plus the four best-placed third teams, qualified for the knockout stage.

Based on group results, the matches would be the following in Round of 16:

The pairings for matches 1, 4, 6 and 7 depend on who the best third places are that qualify for the round of 16. The following table published in Section 28 of the tournament regulations, shows the different options to define the rivals of the winners of groups A, B, C and D.

</onlyinclude>

Bracket

Round of 16

Germany vs Belgium

Spain vs Switzerland

Saudi Arabia vs Sweden

A quick goal by Dahlin in the first half and two second half goals by K. Andersson saw Sweden go through to the quarterfinals. The Saudi players could answer with just one goal scored by Al-Ghesheyan 5 minutes from the end.

Romania vs Argentina
Two quick goals by Dumitrescu and one more by Hagi in the second half sealed the victory for Romanians. After Batistuta's penalty kick and Balbo's rebound Argentina attacked desperately but couldn't score for the third time.

Netherlands vs Republic of Ireland

Brazil vs United States

Nigeria vs Italy

Mexico vs Bulgaria

Quarter-finals

Italy vs Spain

Netherlands vs Brazil

Bulgaria vs Germany

Romania vs Sweden

Semi-finals

Bulgaria vs Italy

Sweden vs Brazil

Third place play-off

Final

References

1994 FIFA World Cup
1994
Mexico at the 1994 FIFA World Cup
Brazil at the 1994 FIFA World Cup
Italy at the 1994 FIFA World Cup
Nigeria at the 1994 FIFA World Cup
Netherlands at the 1994 FIFA World Cup
Republic of Ireland at the 1994 FIFA World Cup
Spain at the 1994 FIFA World Cup
Argentina at the 1994 FIFA World Cup
United States at the 1994 FIFA World Cup
Germany at the 1994 FIFA World Cup
Switzerland at the 1994 FIFA World Cup
Sweden at the 1994 FIFA World Cup
Bulgaria at the 1994 FIFA World Cup
Belgium at the 1994 FIFA World Cup
Saudi Arabia at the 1994 FIFA World Cup